Sonia Ruseler (born 1963 in Buenos Aires, Argentina), studied social and political sciences at Cambridge University.

She worked for the BBC, ITN, and anchored for CNN International from 1993 to 2001. An Argentine and Dutch national, she worked as a senior vice president at The McGinn Group, and Chlopak Leonard and Schechter, both strategic communications consultancy based in Washington D.C. Currently, she is senior director, corporate communications for Arcos Dorados, the largest McDonald's franchisee in the world, with operations in Latin America and the Caribbean.

References

1963 births
Living people
Argentine people of Dutch descent
People from Buenos Aires
Alumni of New Hall, Cambridge
Argentine television journalists
ITN newsreaders and journalists